The 2018 SLFA First Division is the 40th season of top-division football league in Saint Lucia. The season began on 11 February 2018 and ended on 14 March 2018.

Final standings

Top scorers

References

SLFA First Division
Saint Lucia
football